Ertan Özkan (born 1 September 1996) is a Turkish athlete. He competed in the men's 4 × 100 metres relay event at the 2020 Summer Olympics.

References

External links
 

1996 births
Living people
Turkish male sprinters
Athletes (track and field) at the 2020 Summer Olympics
Olympic athletes of Turkey
Sportspeople from Bursa
20th-century Turkish people
21st-century Turkish people
Athletes (track and field) at the 2022 Mediterranean Games
Mediterranean Games silver medalists for Turkey
Mediterranean Games medalists in athletics